Grangier is a surname. Notable people with the surname include:

Gilles Grangier (1911–1996), French film director and screenwriter
India Grangier (born 2000), French cyclist
Michel Grangier (born 1948), French sport wrestler

See also
Granger (name)